Alexandrovsky (masculine), Alexandrovskaya (feminine), or Alexandrovskoye (neuter) may refer to:

Geography
Alexandrovsky District, several districts in Russia
Alexandrovskoye Urban Settlement, a municipal formation in Alexandrovsky Municipal District which a part of the town of krai significance of Alexandrovsk in Perm Krai, Russia is incorporated as
Alexandrovsky, Russia (Alexandrovskaya, Alexandrovskoye), several inhabited localities in Russia
Alexandrovsky Uyezd (1883–1921), an uyezd of Arkhangelsk Governorate of the Russian Empire and the Russian SFSR
Alexandrovskaya Volost (1920–1927), a volost of Alexandrovsky Uyezd of Arkhangelsk Governorate and later of Murmansk Governorate
Alexandrovskoye, former name of Şəhriyar, Sabirabad, a village in Azerbaijan
Fort Alexandrovsky, former name of Fort-Shevchenko, Kazakhstan, from 1857 to 1939
Alexandrovskaya railway station, a railway station in St. Petersburg, Russia
Aleksandrovskaia, a settlement in Russian America founded in 1787 at present-day Seldovia, Alaska

People
Ekaterina Alexandrovskaya (2000–2020), Russian-Australian pairs skater
Stepan Alexandrovsky (1842–1906), Russian painter

Other
Alexandrovsky (meteorite), a meteorite which fell in Chernigov, Ukraine in 1900

See also
Alexandrovsky Sad (disambiguation)